The Sound of Arrows are a Swedish electronic music duo originally from Gävle, and now based in Stockholm. The duo, consisting of Oskar Gullstrand and Stefan Storm, have remixed tracks for artists such as Lady Gaga, Alphabeat, The Naked and Famous, Natalia Kills and Nicole Scherzinger. They also produced the song "Shoot the Bullet" for electropop artist Queen of Hearts.

The band's song "Into the Clouds" was among the most downloaded songs in the United Kingdom for the week of 20 September 2009. Their major-label debut single, "Nova", was released in March 2011 by Geffen Records, and its accompanying music video premiered on Popjustice on 21 February 2011. The follow-up single "Magic" was released in August 2011, having previously been used in a television commercial for the Mitsubishi Outlander car. The duo's debut album, Voyage, was released in November 2011. In 2015, the band announced plans to release a second album. On 17 March 2017, the band released the single "Beautiful Life", their first in five years. Their second album Stay Free was released on their own label in October 2017 on transparent vinyl record and CD through the band's website and in digital form, to mixed reviews.

The Sound of Arrows have been compared to English synthpop duo Pet Shop Boys, and their music has been described as "more heavenly Swedish dream-pop".

Discography

 Voyage (2011)
 Stay Free (2017)

Awards and nominations

Musiclip Festival
The Musiclip Festival is an annual Spanish festival of music, audiovisual arts and music video.

|-
| 2011
| "Magic"
| Best International Music Video
| 
|}

P3 Guld Awards
The P3 Guld award is an annual music award held by Swedish Sveriges Radio.

|-
| 2012
| Voyage
| Best Pop Artist
| 
|}

Scandipop Awards
The Scandipop Awards are an annual British online music award.

|-
| rowspan="3"|2012
| The Sound of Arrows
| Best Group
| 
|-
| Voyage
| Best Group Album
| 
|-
| The Sound of Arrows
| Readers Favourite of 2011
| 
|}

Miscellaneous accolades

See also

 List of dream pop artists
 List of Geffen Records artists
 List of Swedes in music
 List of synthpop artists

References

2006 establishments in Sweden
Dream pop musical groups
Electronic music duos
Gävle
Geffen Records artists
Musical groups established in 2006
Musical groups from Stockholm
Remixers
Swedish indie pop groups
Swedish musical duos
Swedish synthpop groups